CIWEC Clinic Travel Medicine Center , also known as CIWEC Hospital, is a specialist in travel related illnesses in Nepal.  It opened in 1982. It is the first travel medicine center situated in Asia. l.

References

Medical and health organisations based in Nepal
1982 establishments in Nepal
Organisations based in Kathmandu